The New England Quarterly is a peer-reviewed academic journal consisting of articles on New England's cultural, literary, political, and social history. The journal contains essays, interpretations of traditional texts, essay reviews and book reviews. The New England Quarterly was established in 1928 and is published by MIT Press for The New England Quarterly Inc., a nonprofit sponsored by the University of Massachusetts Boston and the Colonial Society of Massachusetts, and supported by the Massachusetts Cultural Council. MIT Press began publishing the journal in 2007.

References

External links 
 
 Journal page on MIT Press website

History of the United States journals
Quarterly journals
MIT Press academic journals
English-language journals
Publications established in 1928
Culture of New England
History of New England